The United States Senate Reception Room is located in the United States Capitol and is one of the Capitol's most richly decorated public rooms that features the work of Italian artist Constantino Brumidi. The room, numbered S-213, has historically been used for meetings and ceremonies. These decorations feature nine permanent portraits of the greatest Senators as determined by a Senate committee. These portraits are placed in massive and ornate golden frames.

Senator portraits

In 1957, a Senate Committee headed by then Senator John F. Kennedy was tasked to decide on the five greatest U.S. Senators of all time so their portraits could decorate the Senate Reception Room. John C. Calhoun (South Carolina) and the two others from the "Great Triumvirate" of Congressional leaders, Daniel Webster (Massachusetts) and Henry Clay (Kentucky), were included as well as Robert A. Taft (Ohio) and Robert M. La Follette (Wisconsin). In 2004, Arthur H. Vandenberg (Michigan) and Robert F. Wagner (New York) were added. In 2006, Roger Sherman and Oliver Ellsworth both from Connecticut were added, changing the group's informal name to become the "famous nine".

References

External links

Clinton might find inspiration in Senate portraits

United States Capitol rooms
United States Capitol grounds
United States Senate